Torpa is a village in Ydre Municipality, Östergötland County. It lies in the traditional province of Östergötland along the shores of Lake Sommen the in South Swedish highlands. According to Svenskt ortnamnslexikon the name of the locality is first attested in 1281 as Thorpum, possibly in reference as "new settlement".

References

Villages in Sweden
Populated lakeshore places in Sweden
Populated places in Ydre Municipality
Sommen